Henry Bacon Lovering (April 8, 1841 – April 5, 1911) was an American  politician and U.S. Representative from Massachusetts.

Early life and education
Born in Portsmouth, New Hampshire, Lovering attended the public schools of Lynn, Massachusetts, and was graduated from Phillips Exeter Academy, Exeter, New Hampshire.

During the Civil War; Lovering enlisted in 1862 in the Eighth Regiment, Massachusetts Volunteer Infantry, and served out his term. 
He reenlisted in the Third Massachusetts Cavalry and served until the Battle of Winchester; where he lost his left leg.

Political career
Lovering served as member of the Massachusetts House of Representatives in 1872 and 1874. He was a member of the Lynn, Massachusetts Board of Assessors in 1879 and 1880. Lovering served as the 18th Mayor of Lynn in 1881 and 1882. He was elected as a Democrat to the Forty-eighth and Forty-ninth Congresses (March 4, 1883 – March 3, 1887). He was an unsuccessful candidate for reelection in 1886 to the Fiftieth Congress. Lovering was Chairmen of the Massachusetts Democratic State Convention of 1886 and the unsuccessful Democratic candidate for Governor of Massachusetts in 1887. In 1888, Lovering was appointed United States Marshal for Massachusetts by President Cleveland, serving until the Republicans returned to power in 1891. Lovering was Warden of the State prison 1891–1893, United States pension agent at Boston 1894–1898, Sealer of weights and measures for the city of Boston, Massachusetts from 1902 to 1905, and Superintendent of the Chardon Street Soldiers' Home at Boston from 1905 to 1907.

Death and Burial
Lovering moved to Wakefield, Massachusetts, in 1907, where he died at the residence of his son on April 5, 1911. Lovering was interred in Pine Grove Cemetery, Lynn, Massachusetts.

See also
 1872 Massachusetts legislature
 1874 Massachusetts legislature

References

Notes

External links
Ex-Congressman Henry B. Lovering. New York Times Obituary, April 6, 1911

1841 births
1911 deaths
Mayors of Lynn, Massachusetts
Democratic Party members of the Massachusetts House of Representatives
People of Massachusetts in the American Civil War
Phillips Exeter Academy alumni
United States Marshals
Union Army soldiers
Democratic Party members of the United States House of Representatives from Massachusetts
19th-century American politicians